Taras Prokhasko ukr. Тарас Богданович Прохасько (born May 16, 1968 in Ivano-Frankivsk) - Ukrainian novelist, essayist and journalist. Together with Yuri Andrukhovych a major representative of the Stanislav phenomenon. Writing of Taras Prokhasko is often associated with magical realism, his novel «The UnSimple» has been compared to One Hundred Years of Solitude by Gabriel García Márquez. Biologist by education Prokhasko's prose has been called to have features of "philosophy of a plant" for its dense and meditative character.

Nephew of writer Iryna Vilde, brother of translator and essayist Yurko Prokhasko.

Biography 
Taras Prokhasko studied botany at Lviv University. In 1989-1991 took part in student protests for the independence of Ukraine. After graduation he took different jobs at the Ivano-Frankivsk Institute of Karpathian Forestry, scholl teacher, bartender, animator on "Vezha" radio, art galleries, newspapers, on TV. In 1992-1994 he edited the avant-guarde literary journal "Chetver". In 1993 and 1994 he acted in short films "Flowers of St. Francis" and "Escape to Egypt" (winner of the Delyatyn video art festival). Worked as a journalist at "Express", "Postup", "Telekrytyka" and "Halytskyi korespondent" newspapers. In 2004 Prokhasko spent several months in Krakow on the «Stowarzyszenie Willa Decjusza — Homines Urbani» foundation scholarship.

Awards 
 1997 - Smoloskyp prize
 2006 - first prize for fiction from "Korespondent" journal
 2007 - third prize for documentary writing from "Korespondent" journal
 2007 - Joseph Conrad prize from the Polish Institute in Kyiv
 2013 - BBC Book of the Year, Litakcent roku for "Who will make the snow"

Bibliography 
 Other Days of Anna (Інші дні Анни)
 FM Halychyna (FM Галичина) 
 The UnSimple (НепрОсті)
 Lexicon of Mysterious Knowledge (Лексикон таємних знань) 
 One Could Make Several Stories from This (З цього можна зробити кілька оповідань)
 Port Frankivsk (Порт Франківськ)
 «Ukraina» together with Serhiy Zhadan
 «Galizien-Bukowina-Express» with Jurko Prokhasko and Magdalena Blashchuk
 Cause it's This Way (БотакЄ) / 
 Who Will Make the Snow (Хто зробить сніг) with Maryana Prokhasko
 One and the Same (Одної і тої самої)
 Taras Prokhasko conducted a series of long interviews with contemporary Ukrainian writers and intellectuals (Oleh Lysheha, Yuriy Izdryk, Yuri Andrukhovych, Oksana Zabuzhko, Borys Gudziak, Yaroslav Hrytsak, Vasyl Herasymyuk), which were published in "The Other Format" book series
 Yes but… (Так, але...)
 Because it is so (Бо є так)

Translations 
Prokhasko's writings were translated in English, German, Polish, Belarusian and Russian.

Texts available in English 
 «Necropolis» in «Two Lands, New Visions» (1998) anthology
 «The UnSimple», 2011
 FM Galicia

Notes

External links
 Biography of T. Prokhasko
 Тарас Прохасько: ліричний ботан. Рецензія

1968 births
Living people
Writers from Ivano-Frankivsk
People of the Revolution on Granite
Postmodern writers
University of Lviv alumni
Ukrainian essayists
Male essayists
Ukrainian male writers
Counterculture of the 1990s